James A. Runde is an American investment banker, author and corporate director specializing in strategic and financial advice.  As a 50 year veteran of Morgan Stanley, he is now an Advisory Director and a former Vice Chairman.  Runde is one of America's longest-serving investment bankers at a single institution and was honored by Morgan Stanley in 2014 for his length of service as well as ongoing contributions to the firm.  Over the course of his 50 year career, he has served as a trusted advisor to many of the world's leading companies, with a focus on the transportation and infrastructure industries.  He has been a member of the board of directors of The Kroger Co., one of the nation's largest grocery retail chains and also served on the board of directors of Burlington Resources, a major U.S. oil and gas company.  In addition, he served as a trustee of The Morgan Library & Museum along with Annette de la Renta.

Runde's debut book entitled “Unequaled: Tips for Building a Successful Career through Emotional Intelligence” was published by John C.Wiley & Sons, Inc. Drawing from the author's extensive business experience and adapted from his presentations to major corporations and universities, Unequaled is a guide to getting ahead and achieving professional goals, with a particular focus on soft skills or emotional intelligence. Unequaled has been featured in Harvard Business Review, Bloomberg, Business Insider and Knowledge@Wharton.

Runde serves on the Business Advisory Committee of the Northwestern University Transportation Center, a leading interdisciplinary education and research institution dedicated to the long-term improvement of domestic and international systems for the movements of materials, people, energy and information.

In terms of public service, Runde was selected to serve on a blue ribbon panel along with Speaker Newt Gingrich, Justice Sandra Day O'Connor and Senator Bob Kerrey to develop a national strategic plan to defeat Alzheimer's disease.

Early years and education
One of ten children, James Runde grew up in Sparta, Wisconsin. His parents Orlin and Kathleen Runde were elementary school teachers as young adults.  They each taught all eight grades in one-room country schoolhouses in rural Wisconsin.

While he was a student in Sparta, he held a variety of temporary jobs including radio announcer at WCOW, pickle packer at HJ Heinz, chemist at Northern Engraving Co., barracks cleaner at Fort McCoy and a newspaper deliverer. Following graduation from Sparta High School as co-valedictorian, he accepted a Naval Reserve Officer Training Corps (NROTC) scholarship and enrolled in the College of Engineering at Marquette University in Milwaukee.

James Runde then served as an officer in the U.S. Navy for five years on the Naval Reactors nuclear energy staff of Admiral Rickover and was awarded the National Defense Service Medal.  While on active duty, he attended George Washington University School of Business using the G.I. Bill and earned a master's degree in finance.

James Runde has been active with his alma mater and was elected to the board of trustees of Marquette  where he served together with NBA coach Doc Rivers and Packers great Willie Davis.

Career
Runde joined Morgan Stanley in 1974 as an Associate. He was promoted through the ranks, ultimately achieving the position of Vice Chairman. While at Morgan Stanley, Runde was a protégé of the late S. Parker Gilbert. His current position with Morgan Stanley is Advisory Director.

During his long career at Morgan Stanley, he became best known for his important role in advising the United Parcel Service on its initial public offering. He also played a key role in the privatization of Conrail and the initial public offering of China Eastern Airlines.  Runde provided valuable strategic and financing advice to Philip Anschutz in the mergers and restructurings of the Southern Pacific/Union Pacific/Denver Rio Grande Railways.  In addition to advising clients, Runde advises generations of younger investment bankers and gives his fellow bankers practical advice on how to handle client relationships, deals and competitors.[2]  Based on his contributions and accomplishments, Business Insider described Runde as a "legendary banker."

Recent activities
In 2007, Runde was selected to serve on the Alzheimer's Study Group, an independent, bipartisan panel created to evaluate the government's current efforts to combat the disease. Runde served on this study group with Former Speaker Newt Gingrich, Retired Justice Sandra Day O'Connor and Former Senator Bob Kerrey. In January 2011, President Obama signed the National Alzheimer's Project Act ("NAPA") into law. This landmark legislation creates a national strategic plan to overcome the Alzheimer's disease epidemic based on the recommendations of the Alzheimer's Study Group.

Runde was selected to be a member of the Advisory Council of American Corporate Partners (“ACP”), a nonprofit organization dedicated to assisting veterans in their transition from the armed services to the civilian workforce. He serves on this council with General David Petraeus, Former Clinton Advisor and Senior Managing Director of Lazard Frères Vernon Jordan Jr.

With respect to philanthropy, Runde and his wife are financial supporters of activities that support children in education, arts and health. They recently underwrote a scholarship fund at Marquette University and exhibits of The Little Prince, Beatrix Potter and Babar the Elephant at the Morgan Library.  They are also important benefactors to the Morgan Stanley Children's Hospital and the Boca Grande Health Clinic.

Runde is a member of the Economic Club of New York, whose members are representatives from the top executive levels of business, industry and finance.

Personal life 
James Runde and his wife Barbara reside in Boca Grande, Florida and have three grown children.  He plays a leadership role in several community organizations and delivers presentations on current affairs

Awards
Marquette University's College of Engineering presented James Runde with its Professional Achievement Award for his distinguished service to the University and his extraordinary professional accomplishments.

Speeches 
Runde has spoken at international industry forums concerning post office strategy and financial issues.
 
• "Laying the Foundation of the Future UPU Postal Strategy". Report of the 2006 UPU Strategy Conference, Dubai, United Arab Emirates, November 14 to 16, 2006

Runde speaks about a variety of talent strategy subjects at Morgan Stanley, on university campuses and at conferences.

• "View from the Top: The Journey from George Washington to Industry Leadership". The New York Palace, New York, NY, November 3, 2011, https://archive.today/20130724171607/https://secure.www.alumniconnections.com/olc/pub/GEW/event/showEventForm.jsp?form_id=114455

• "A Conversation on Leadership: The Role of Men in Promoting Women to Positions of Power". Impact Center, New York, NY, January 25, 2011, https://web.archive.org/web/20130601022244/http://www.the-impact-center.org/programs_2011_jan25/

• Marquette University Finance Students to Visit Morgan Stanley hosted by Jim Runde, New York, NY, October 16, 2010, http://aimprogramblog.blogspot.com/2010/10/marquette-university-finance-students.html

Also one from 2013...http://www.marquette.edu/magazine/recent.php?subaction=showfull&id=1358178635&archive=

• "Careers in Finance". Keynote Speaker at 2008 Annual Finance Conference, Harvard Business School Finance Club, Boston, MA, November 8, 2008, https://web.archive.org/web/20121111174433/http://2008.hbsfinanceconference.com/keynotes.php

• Presentation to Prospective Employees of Morgan Stanley at a Speech at Morgan Stanley that was referenced in Fast Company "Careers: Rules of Engagement", by Shawn Graham, October 23, 2007, http://www.fastcompany.com/661090/careers-rules-engagement

• "Laying the Foundation for the Future UPU Postal Strategy".  Report of the UPU Strategy Conference, Dubai, United Arab Emirates, November 14t to 16, 2006.

Publications
Runde is a frequent contributor to The Journal of Applied Corporate Finance on infrastructure financing techniques and the railroad industry.

• Runde, James, et al. "Public Pensions and U.S. Infrastructure Investment: The Perfect Partnership?" Volume 24, Issue 2, 2012 http://www.morganstanley.com/views/jacf/archive/21e9c676-d81f-11e1-8510-13de465f364e.html

• Runde, James, et al. "Infrastructure Public-Private Partnerships: 'Partnerships' Come to Fruition" Volume 23, Issue 3, 2011 http://www.cato.org/sites/cato.org/files/articles/hanke-jacf-v23n3-2.pdf

• Runde, James, et al. "Infrastructure Public-Private Partnerships Re-Defined: An Increased Emphasis on 'Partnerships'" Volume 22, Issue 2, 2010, http://onlinelibrary.wiley.com/doi/10.1111/j.1745-6622.2010.00275.x/abstract

• Runde, James. "Rail Companies: Prospects for Privatization and Consolidation". Journal of Applied Corporate Finance, Volume 19, Issue 2, 2007, https://onlinelibrary.wiley.com/doi/abs/10.1111/j.1745-6622.2007.00138.x

• Runde, James. "Rail companies and capital markets", in Competition in Europe's Rail Freight Market, published by Community of European Railway and Infrastructure Companies (CER), January 2007. Press Release.

References

American corporate directors
Marquette University alumni
People from Sparta, Wisconsin
American bankers
Living people
George Washington University School of Business alumni
Year of birth missing (living people)